The  list of submarines in the Spanish Navy, commissioned or otherwise operated by the Spanish Navy.

Peral "submarine torpedo boat" 

 Peral 1888 – 1890. Preserved as museum ship at Cartagena.

Isaac Peral class submarine 

 Isaac Peral (A-0) 1917 – 1932.

A class 

 Narciso Monturiol (A-1) 1917 – 1934 (named for Narcís Monturiol i Estarriol).
 Cosme Garcia (A-2) 1917 – 1931 (named for Cosme García Sáez).
 A-3 1917 – 1932.

B class 
 B-1 1922 – 1940. Sunk in Bay of Alcudia, Mallorca
 B-2 1922 – 1952.
 B-3 1922 – 1940.
 B-4 1923 – 1941.
 B-5 1925 – 1936, sunk near Estepona.
 B-6 1926 – 1936, sunk by Spanish destroyer Velasco during Spanish Civil War.

C class 

 Isaac Peral (C-1) 1928 – 1950.
 C-2 1928 – 1951.
 C-3 1928 – 1936, sunk by German submarine U-34.
 C-4 1928 – 1946, accidentally rammed by Spanish destroyer Lepanto.
 C-5 1928 – 1937, missing.
 C-6 1928 – 1937, scuttled.

D class  
 D-1 renamed S-11. 1947 – 1965.
 D-2 refitted and renamed S-21. 1951 – 1971.
 D-3 refitted and renamed S-22. 1954 – 1971.

General Mola class 
 
 General Mola ex- Italian Archimede. 1937 – 1958.
 General Sanjurjo ex-Italian Torricelli. 1937 – 1958.

G Class  

 6 ships (G-1 to G-6) German Type VIIC built in Spain under license; cancelled, only one keel laid.
 G-7; renamed S-01 ex-U-573  1942 – 1970.

Foca class 

 SA-41 1963 – 1967. Preserved as museum ship at Mahon.
 SA-42 1963 – 1967. Preserved as museum ship at Cartagena.

Tiburón class 
 SA-51 1966. Preserved as museum ship at Barcelona.
 SA-52 1966. Preserved as museum ship at Cartagena.

Balao class submarine 

 Almirante García de los Reyes (S-31) ex- 1959 – 1982.
 Isaac Peral (S-32) ex- (Guppy IIA) 1971 – 1987.
 Narciso Monturiol (S-33) ex- (Guppy IIA) 1972 – 1977.
 Cosme García (S-34) ex- (Guppy IIA) 1972 – 1983.
 Narciso Monturiol (S-35) ex- (Guppy IIA) 1974 – 1984.

Delfín class   

French Daphné class submarine built in Spain under license
 Delfín (S-61) 1973 – 2003. Preserved as museum ship at Torrevieja
 Tonina (S-62) 1973 – 2005. Awaiting destination, possible museum ship
 Marsopa (S-63) 1975 – 2006.
 Narval (S-64) 1975 – 2003.

Galerna class   

French Agosta class submarine built in Spain under license
 Galerna (S-71) 1983 – Active.
 Siroco (S-72) 1983 – June 2012.
 Mistral (S-73) 1985 – Scheduled for auction
 Tramontana (S-74) 1986 – Active.

S-80 class 
 Isaac Peral (S-81) Finished.
 Narciso Monturiol (S-82)  Under construction.
 Cosme García (S-83)  Under construction.
 Mateo García de los Reyes (S-84)  Under construction.

See also 
 List of active Spanish Navy ships
 List of retired Spanish Navy ships
 Ictíneo I
 Ictíneo II
 Submarino E-1

References

Bibliography
 

 
Submarines
Spain